Indiana Tower was the proposed centerpiece of White River State Park in Indianapolis, Indiana, United States. Designed by César Pelli in 1980, the plan was ultimately scrapped.

Proposal
As part of the downtown revitalization campaign for Indianapolis, the state solicited designs for a distinctive piece of skyline architecture in the tradition of the Gateway Arch in St. Louis or the Space Needle in Seattle. The Pelli tower was to be located in the new Indiana Landing area of Indianapolis (which later became White River State Park). As such, the design would have been taller than the Arch, the Washington Monument, and the Statue of Liberty. The proposed $25 million included the rerouting of West Washington Street to the south so that the tower could be placed on the east bank of the White River where the street had crossed the river.

Failure
The design was met with little local support. Some residents feared it too closely resembled a corncob, which would further the stereotype of Indiana as wholly rural. Others believed the bold nature of the design would overshadow the Soldiers' and Sailors' Monument, which had been the historic focal point of the city's design.  The park took shape and thrived without its vertical landmark. However, following the success of the rest of the revitalization campaign, there have been renewed calls for construction of the tower. Pelli himself remained fond of the design, insisting that if the opportunity to make the project a reality materialized, he would have done it.

References

External links
Emporis profile
NUVO article on the design

Towers in Indiana
White River State Park
Unbuilt buildings and structures in the United States